This is the list of the stations on digital television in Vietnam.The channels are available to viewers depends on the location.

The current DVB-T2 television system is being used to broadcast television on the UHF band nationwide, with the participation of transmission providers: VTV, SDTV, VTC, AVG and DTV, on frequencies from E21–E48.

A brief outline of the TV digitization project

On December 27, 2011, Prime Minister Nguyen Tan Dung issued Decision No. 2451/QD-TTg approving the "Decision No. 2451/QD-TTg" project to digitize transmission and broadcast terrestrial television until 2020". The project officially started on April 1, 2014.

Route 
To implement the digitization plan, provinces and cities are divided into 4 groups on the basis of socio-economic development level, radio transmission conditions and local frequency allocation capability. Each stage of television digitization will be done with each of these groups. However, compared to the original schedule, the time to stop broadcasting analogue terrestrial television in some localities has been delayed for some time due to difficulties in preparation and implementation.

Result 
At the press conference taking place on January 11, 2021, Minister Ministry of Information and Communications Nguyen Manh Hung announced that Vietnam has completed the shutdown of terrestrial analogue television and officially completed the project of terrestrial television digitization. Through the digitization of terrestrial television, Vietnam has:

 Released 112 MHz on the band 700 MHz, which is the band with the best coverage today for 5G mobile communications nationwide.
 Expanded digital terrestrial TV coverage to 80% of the population, compared to 50% of the population in 2011.
 Attracted social resources to cover terrestrial digital television.
 Organized and arrange all local radio and television stations in the direction of specialization and professionalism, focusing on producing program content and hiring transmission and broadcasting services.

In the world, Vietnam ranks 78th out of 193 countries that have completed turning off analogue terrestrial television.

DVB-T2 frequency in localities

Channels broadcasting (Free to Air in the country)

VTC 

VTC1 HD
VTC2
VTC3 HD
VTC4
VTC5
VTC TEST
VTC7 HD
VTC8
VTC9 HD
VTC10
VTC6 HD
VTC12
VTC13 HD
VTC14 HD
VOVTV HD
VTC16 HD
HTV7 HD
HTV9 HD
Dong Nai 1
Hai Phong HD
Thai Binh HD
Thanh Hoa HD
VTC11
QPVN
THVL1 HD
THVL2 HD
THVL3 HD
Local Channel
VOV1 (Radio)
VOV3 (Radio)

SDTV

South Central and Highlands Central

Con Dao Island

Southeast Region and Southwest Region (Mekong Delta)

DTV (Red River Delta and Northeast, Northwest Region)

AVG 

AVG Promo Channel
Quoc Hoi HD
BTV11
BPTV3 - ANT
Ninh Binh HD (Northern)
Hung Yen HD
Bac Ninh HD
Nam Dinh HD (Northern)

DVB-T frequency in localities (defunct)

Channels

VTC Foreign channels (defunct)  
 Super Sports 3 
 Australia Network 
 True Sports
 Channel News Asia  
 CCTV4
 CCTV5
 CCTV8
 CCTV9
 Russia Today
 CNN  
 BBC World News
 DW.TV
 Euronews
 Animal Planet 
 Channel V China
 MTV Europe
 Arirang
 Fashion TV 
 Cartoon Network
 Discovery Channel
 Cinemax
 TV5 Monde
 HBO 
 OPT1  
 Star Sports
 National Geographic Channel

VTC Domestic 
 VTV1
 VTV2 (defunct)
 VTV3 (defunct)
 VTV4 (defunct)
 Hanoi TV  
 Hanoi TV2 
 HTV2 (defunct)
 HTV7 (defunct)
 HTV9 (defunct)
 HTVC Thuần Việt (defunct)
 Vietnamnet TV
 VTC1
 VTC2
 VTC3
 VTC4
 VTC5
 VTC6
 VTC7
 VTC8
 VTC9
 VTC10
 VTC11 
 VTC12
 VTC13  
 VTC14
 VTC16
 THVL1 (defunct)
 NTV Nghe An (defunct)
 TTV Thanh Hoa (defunct)
 THP Hai Phong (defunct)
 KG1 Kien Giang (defunct)
 QTV1 Quang Ninh (defunct)  
 MTV Vietnam
 VOVTV
 QPVN
 Quoc Hoi
 SCTV5 (defunct)
 SCTV10
 VGS Shop
 VOV1
 VOV3

Hanel (defunct) 
 VTV3
 HanoiTV
 Hanel TV channel

HTV (30 -> 39 -> 25 UHF) (defunct) 
HTV1
HTV2
HTV3
HTV4
HTV7
HTV9
VTV1
VTV3

BTV Digital (50, 53 UHF) (defunct)
BTV1
BTV2
BTV3
BTV4 
BTV5
BTV6 
BTV7
BTV8
BTV9
Super Sports
Super Sports Gold 
VTC1
VTC2
ESPN
Star Sports
HBO
Cinemax
Discovery Channel
MTV Asia
VTV1
VTV2
VTV3
VTV4 
VTV6
HTV7
CCTV9
Animal Planet
CNN
DW.TV
Super Sports Gold
Cartoon Network 
TV5 Monde 
CCTV4
Hanoi TV1

See also 
Television and mass media in Vietnam
DVB-T2
Vietnam Television
List of analog television stations in Vietnam

Notes

References

Television, digital
Television in Vietnam
Television, digital